Lefor, North Dakota, a location in the United States
 Michael "Mike" Lefor, an American politician